ISO 3166-2:DK is the entry for Denmark in ISO 3166-2, part of the ISO 3166 standard published by the International Organization for Standardization (ISO), which defines codes for the names of the principal subdivisions (e.g., provinces or states) of all countries coded in ISO 3166-1.

The current version of the standard defines codes for the five regions of Denmark created during the municipal reform of 2007.

Each code consists of two parts, separated by a hyphen. The second part is a two-digit number between 81 and 85.

Current codes

Subdivision names are listed as shown in the second edition of the ISO 3166-2 standard, published by the ISO 3166 Maintenance Agency.

In 2011, by request of the Danish Government, the prefix Region was removed from the name of each subdivision and the list was re-sorted to show the names in Danish alphabetical order (a–z, æ, ø, å) rather than numerical sequence.

 Notes

Earlier codes

The first edition of ISO 3166-2, published in 1998, defined codes for 14 counties, and two municipalities with county status:

See also
 ISO 3166-2:GL
 Subdivisions of Denmark
 Subdivisions of Greenland
 FIPS region codes of Denmark
 NUTS codes of Denmark

References

External links
 ISO Online Browsing Platform: DK
 Regions of Denmark, Statoids.com

2:DK
ISO 3166-2
Denmark geography-related lists
Administrative divisions of Denmark